is a 2022 anime film directed by Hiroshi Negishi and produced by Ashi Productions. It premiered on the internet streaming site Niconico on 14 May 2022. Attack Travel! is the first anime project in the Jewelpet franchise (created as a joint venture between Sanrio and Sega Toys) in 7 years; originally meant to celebrate the 10th anniversary of the franchise being adapted for television.

It was first set for release on February 7, 2020, and would have been attached to the first feature film from Negishi's Zero-G animation studio, an original project titled . On January 24, 2020 Sanrio and AEON Entertainment announced that both projects had been removed from the 2020 release schedule.

On March 29, 2022, Sanrio announced that the short will be released on Blu-ray, as a part of the BD-BOX of Jewelpet Sunshine, on July 27, 2022.

Synopsis
Ruby and her friends are going on a school trip with Teacher Iruka to Sichuan Province in China. However, there is something unnatural about the tour conductor, driver, and guide on their sightseeing bus as it heads towards its final destination.

Voice cast 

 Ayaka Saito as Ruby
 Aya Hirano as Garnet
 Nozomi Sasaki as Sapphie
 Miyuki Sawashiro as Labra
 Mayumi Tsuchiya as Rald
 Masami Iwasaki as Iruka Sensei
 Takeshi Kusao as Tour Conductor
 Kazuki Yao as Driver
 Marie Miyake as Bus Guide
 Risae Matsuda as O-Saru
 Rei Matsuzaki as Fairy
 Yōji Ueda as Fairy

References

External links 
 Original official website for planned theatrical release (in Japanese)
 New official website (in Japanese)
 Jewelpet Attack Travel! on Anime News Network's encyclopedia

Jewelpet
Mecha anime and manga
Ashi Productions
2022 anime films
2022 animated films
Japanese animated films
Films set in Sichuan
Comedy anime and manga
Fantasy anime and manga